Juicy Lucy is an album by guitarist Sal Salvador which was recorded in 1978 and released on the Bee Hive label.

Reception

The AllMusic review by Scott Yanow stated, " The well-conceived set has swinging versions of two of Salvador's originals, Taylor's "Daddy-O" and three standards. "Tune For Two" (an intense Salvador-Morello duet) and the medium-tempo blues "Northern Lights" are highlights of the enjoyable set".

Track listing

Personnel
Sal Salvador – guitar
Billy Taylor – piano (tracks 1, 2 & 4-6)
Art Davis – bass (tracks 1, 2 & 4-6)
Joe Morello – drums

References

Sal Salvador albums
1979 albums
Bee Hive Records albums